The Martin Luther King Memorial Bridge (formerly Cherry Street Bridge) is a double-leaf bascule bridge adjacent to downtown Toledo, Ohio, where Cherry Street crosses the Maumee River to become Main Street on the east side of the city.  The structure opened to traffic in 1914.

History

In 2001 the bridge started what was to have been a $31 million USD refurbishment.  This refurbishment widened the bridge's four lanes and added pedestrian walkways.
The bridge's original control towers were replaced with new towers, modeled after the originals.

When originally built, the streetcars operated by the Toledo Railways & Light Company shared the bridge with motor vehicles.
The technique employed to keep the streetcar's power wire taut when in use, yet allowing the bridge to be raised, was considered innovative and was copied in similar bridges.
The bridge's original deck was an open metal mesh.

The bridge was designed by Arnold W. Brunner and built by Osborn Engineering.
It is located a mile upstream from the Veterans' Glass City Skyway where Interstate 280 crosses the river.

References

External links
 

Buildings and structures in Toledo, Ohio
Transportation in Toledo, Ohio
Road bridges in Ohio
Bascule bridges in the United States